Dr. Shanti Rai is an Indian gynaecologist. She was awarded the Padma Shri in 2020 for her contribution in medicine. She hails from the Gopalganj district of Bihar. She used to practice in Siwan but now practices in Patna.She is the Head of the Department of gynecology in the Patna Medical College.

References

Living people
Recipients of the Padma Shri in medicine
Medical doctors from Bihar
Year of birth missing (living people)
Indian women gynaecologists